This is the list of notable stars in the constellation Perseus, sorted by decreasing brightness.

See also 
 List of stars by constellation

Ambiguity 
Some sources, including Starry Night (planetarium software), an atlas,  and a web site attribute the name 'Atik' to Zeta Persei instead of nearby Omicron Persei.

References 

 
 
 

List
Perseus